Princess Johanna Beatrix von Dietrichstein (1625 – 26 March 1676), was a German noblewoman, by birth a member of the princely House of Dietrichstein and by marriage Princess of Liechtenstein.

Early life
She was the fifth child and fourth (but third surviving) daughter of Maximilian, 2nd Prince von Dietrichstein zu Nikolsburg, and his first wife Princess Anna Maria of Liechtenstein, a daughter of Karl I, Prince of Liechtenstein, Duke of Troppau and Jägerndorf and Anna Maria Šemberová of Boskovice and Černá Hora.

Marriage and issue
On 4 August 1644 Johanna Beatrix married Karl Eusebius, Prince of Liechtenstein (11 April 1611 – 5 April 1684). They had eleven children:

 Ernest Rochus (2 February 1646 – ca. 30 March 1647).
 Eleonora Maria Rosalia (ca. 15 May 1647 – 7 August 1703), married on 4 July 1666 to Johann Seyfried, Prince of Eggenberg, Duke of Český Krumlov and Princely Count (gefürsteter Graf) of Gradisca d'Isonzo.
 Anna Maria (ca. 24 May 1648 – 14 March 1654).
 Johanna Beatrix (28 Jun 1649 – 12 January 1672), married on 29 April 1669 to Maximilian II Jakob Moritz, Prince of Liechtenstein.
 Maria Theresia (1650 – 25 January 1716), married firstly on 16 July 1667 to Count Jakob Leslie and secondly on 3 February 1693 to Count Johann Balthasar von Wagensperg, Baron von Sonnegg.
 Franz Dominik Eusebius (1 November 1652 – 6 November 1652).
 Karl Joseph (1 November 1652 – 7 November 1652), twin with Franz Dominik Eusebius.
 Franz Eusebius Wenzel (31 May 1654 – 25 June 1655).
 Cäcilie (6 August 1655 – 9 November 1655).
 Johann (Hans) Adam Andreas (16 August 1662 – 16 June 1712), Prince of Liechtenstein.
 A daughter (died in infancy, April 1661).

Johanna Beatrix died in Brno aged 51.

Notes

1625 births
1676 deaths
Dietrichstein family
Princely consorts of Liechtenstein